Antonio Mance (born 7 August 1995) is a Croatian professional footballer who plays as a forward for Debrecen.

Club career
Mance is a product of youth system of Pomorac Kostrena. Then, he joined Istra 1961. He made his top division debut on 13 April 2014 against Hrvatski Dragovoljac.

On 31 January 2019, Mance moved to Nantes on a loan, to replace the late Emiliano Sala, who died in a plane crash.

After Mance's loan at Nantes finished, on 21 June 2019, he returned to Croatia and signed a four-year contract with Osijek. The transfer fee was reported as €1 million.

He joined 2. Bundesliga club Erzgebirge Aue on a season-long loan from Osijek in August 2021. The loan was cut short in January 2022. He made eight appearances without scoring a goal.

In January 2023, Mance joined Hungarian club Debrecen on an eighteen-month contract.

International career
Mance played for Croatia U19 and Croatia U20.

Career statistics

Club

Personal life
An younger brother of Armando Mance, Armando also works as Antonio's agent.

Honours
NK Domžale
 Slovenian Cup: 2017

References

External links

1995 births
Living people
Footballers from Rijeka
Association football forwards
Croatian footballers
Croatia youth international footballers
NK Istra 1961 players
NK Pomorac 1921 players
NK Domžale players
AS Trenčín players
FC Nantes players
NK Osijek players
Puskás Akadémia FC players
FC Erzgebirge Aue players
Debreceni VSC players
Croatian Football League players
Slovenian PrvaLiga players
Slovak Super Liga players
Ligue 1 players
Nemzeti Bajnokság I players
Croatian expatriate footballers
Expatriate footballers in Slovenia
Croatian expatriate sportspeople in Slovenia
Expatriate footballers in Slovakia
Croatian expatriate sportspeople in Slovakia
Croatian expatriate sportspeople in France
Expatriate footballers in France
Croatian expatriate sportspeople in Hungary
Expatriate footballers in Hungary
Croatian expatriate sportspeople in Germany
Expatriate footballers in Germany